Krzysztof Rejno (born 22 February 1993) is a Polish volleyball player, a two–time Champions League winner (2021, 2022). At the professional club level, he plays for Aluron CMC Warta Zawiercie.

Career
In 2014, Rejno joined the team of ZAKSA Kędzierzyn-Koźle team. In April 2015, the club decided to extend its contract with Rejno for the next 2 years.

Honours

Clubs
 CEV Champions League
  2020/2021 – with ZAKSA Kędzierzyn-Koźle
  2021/2022 – with ZAKSA Kędzierzyn-Koźle

 National championships
 2015/2016  Polish Championship, with ZAKSA Kędzierzyn-Koźle
 2019/2020  Polish SuperCup, with ZAKSA Kędzierzyn-Koźle
 2020/2021  Polish SuperCup, with ZAKSA Kędzierzyn-Koźle
 2020/2021  Polish Cup, with ZAKSA Kędzierzyn-Koźle
 2021/2022  Polish Cup, with ZAKSA Kędzierzyn-Koźle
 2021/2022  Polish Championship, with ZAKSA Kędzierzyn-Koźle

References

External links
 
 Player profile at PlusLiga.pl 
 Player profile at Volleybox.net

1993 births
Living people
Sportspeople from Wrocław
Polish men's volleyball players
BKS Visła Bydgoszcz players
Stal Nysa players
ZAKSA Kędzierzyn-Koźle players
MKS Będzin players
Warta Zawiercie players
Middle blockers